Orleans is an unincorporated community in Clow Township, Kittson County, Minnesota, United States.  The community is located near the junction of Kittson County Roads 1, 6, and 55.  Nearby places include Humboldt, Lancaster, and Hallock.  The Little Joe River flows nearby.  363rd Street and County Road 8 are also in the immediate area.

A post office called Orleans was established in 1904, and remained in operation until 1984. According to Warren Upham, the community was named directly or indirectly after Orléans, in France.

References

Unincorporated communities in Kittson County, Minnesota
Unincorporated communities in Minnesota